James Gordon Brodie Laing (born 10 January 1938) is a Scottish former first-class cricketer.

Laing was born in January 1938 at Meigle, Ayrshire. He was educated at Alyth School. A club cricketer for Perthshire County Cricket Club, he made his debut in first-class cricket for Scotland against Warwickshire at Edgbaston during Scotland's 1964 tour of England. He played first-class for Scotland until 1974, making nineteen appearances. Playing as a top order batsman, Laing scored 655 runs at an average of 23.39; he made three half centuries, with a highest score of 93. His brother, Ralph, was also a first-class cricketer.

References

External links
 

1938 births
Living people
Cricketers from Perth and Kinross
Scottish cricketers